Giovanni Borgia, 2nd Duke of Gandía (1476–1497) was the second born and the second son of Pope Alexander VI and Vannozza Cattanei and a member of the House of Borgia. He was the brother of Cesare, Gioffre, and Lucrezia Borgia. He was murdered on 14 June 1497. Even today, it is not known with certainty who was responsible for his death, although many at the time blamed his brother Cesare.

Early life, marriage, and family

Giovanni Borgia was probably born in Rome in 1476 to then-cardinal Rodrigo Borgia (later to become Pope Alexander VI), and his mistress, Vannozza dei Cattanei, who was married to Domenico da Rignano. He was the second son of the couple, after the firstborn Cesare. In September 1493, Giovanni married Maria Enriquez de Luna, the Spanish betrothed of his deceased older half-brother, Pier Luigi de Borgia, 1st duke of Gandía. He succeeded his brother as 2nd Duke of Gandía, and was made Duke of Sessa, Grand Constable of Naples, Governor of St. Peter's, and Gonfalonier and Captain General of the Church.

Giovanni and Maria had two children, a son and a daughter. The firstborn was Juan de Borja y Enríquez, 3rd Duke of Gandía (father of Saint Francis Borgia, who was also 4th Duke of Gandía). Their daughter, Isabel de Borja y Enríquez, was born in 1496 in Gandia and never knew her father, who was killed in June 1497 at Rome; she grew up to be abbess of Santa Clara in Gandía.

Murder 
Borgia was murdered on the night of 14 June 1497 near what later became the Piazza della Giudecca in the ghetto of Rome. Giovanni was last seen alive when he was leaving a feast that his mother had arranged in his honour at her villa near the Church of San Pietro in Vincoli with his other siblings Cesare, Lucrezia, and Gioffre; Gioffre's wife Sancha of Aragon, their cousin Juan Borgia Lanzol, and Vannozza's husband, Carlo Canale, were all in attendance. Later Giovanni and his brother rode to the Papal Palace; at the Palace of Cardinal Ascanio Sforza where the Duke told his brother he was going to visit his mistress; Giovanni dismissed his retainers. He took only his valet and a masked man whose identity is unknown but who had been noticed visiting Giovanni several times in the month before his death. Giovanni rode as far as the ghetto where he ordered the groom to wait for him until a certain hour when he was to return to the palace. He rode off with the masked man. The next morning his horse came back without its rider and with one of the stirrups cut. The groom was found dying.

"When the next morning, Thursday, June 15, the Duke did not return to the palace, his more familiar servants became restless and one of them reported the late exit of the Duke and Cesares and the unsuccessfully awaited return of the former in the morning to the Pope. The Pope was dismayed by this, he initially persuaded himself that the Duke was having fun somewhere with a girl and therefore embarressed from leaving her house in broad daylight, but hoped that he would come home that evening at least. When this did not happen either, the Pope was gripped by deadly terror.."

Alexander ordered interrogations and a search for his son and a witness was found, a Slavonian timber dealer named Georgio who made a statement that led to the discovery of Giovanni's body. He had been lying in his boat on the Tiber on the night of the murder to guard his wood and watched as five men had thrown a corpse into the river next to the fountain at the Hospital of Jerome, where refuse was usually disposed of.

"...It was around 2 o'clock in the morning when two men came out of the lane next to the hospital on to the public road by the river. They looked cautiously around to see if anyone was passing and when they did not see anyone they disappeared again in the lane. After a little while two others came out of the lane, looked about in the same way and made a sign to their companions when they discovered nobody. Thereupon a rider on a white horse appeared who had a corpse behind him with the head and arms hanging down on one side and his legs on the other and supported on both sides by the two men who had first appeared. The procession advanced to the place where refuse is thrown into the river. At the bank they came to a halt and turned the horse with its tail to the river. Then they lifted the corpse, one holding it by its hands and arms, the other by its legs and feet, dragged it down from the horse and cast it with all their strength into the river.

To the question of the rider if it was safely in; they answered, "Yes, Sir." Then the one sitting on the horse cast another look at the river, and seeing the cloak  of the corpse floating in the river and asked his companions what was the black thing that was floating there? They said, "The Cloak"; thereupon he threw stones at the garment to make it sink to the bottom. Then all five of them, including the other two who had kept watch, and now rejoined the rider and his two companions, departed and took their way together through another lane that leads to the Hospital of St. James."

When asked why he had not reported the murder the man replied:"In my day I have seen as many as a hundred corpses thrown into the river at that place on different nights without anyone troubling himself about it, and so I attached no importance about it ."

Fishermen and boatmen were summoned to drag the river; on June 16 Giovanni's body was recovered from the Tiber, "Just before Vespers when they found the Duke still fully clad, with his stockings, shoes, waistcoat and cloak, and in his belt there was his purse with 30 ducats. He had nine wounds, one in the neck through the throat, the other eight in the head, body and legs...."

To the immense grief of the pope, this act occasioned the epigram by Sannazzaro on the pope as "fisher of men." Borgia's only attendant was also slain, so there were no known witnesses. His grief-stricken father launched an intensive investigation into the murder, only to end it abruptly a week later. While the Orsini family had ample motive to kill Giovanni, it was later rumoured that his younger brother Gioffre Borgia murdered him due to Giovanni's relationship with Gioffre's wife, Sancha. However, most suspicions at the time centered on Giovanni's other brother, Cesare Borgia. A personal rivalry existed between the two brothers and, with Giovanni's death, Cesare was finally allowed to leave the Church as he wished, taking his dead brother's place as a man-at-arms. Giovanni's wife was also convinced of Cesare's guilt and tried, in vain, to have her brother-in-law tried. To date, although the historical consensus generally indicates the Orsinis as the culprits, the perpetrator of the crime, nor his motivations, are not known with certainty.

Suspects

As the killers were never identified, there are three theories as the suspects and motives:
The killer was either his younger brother Gioffre Borgia who murdered him due to Giovanni's relationship with Gioffre's wife, Sancha or his brother Cesare Borgia who also had a relationship with Sancha. [One salient fact is that Alexander despite his immense grief over Juan's death closed the investigation after a week (i.e. Alexander knew or suspected the killer was a member of his own family)]
The killer was Antonio Maria della Mirandola the father of a young girl, whose house was located near the Tiber. Shortly before his death, Juan did not miss the opportunity to mention that he dishonored the daughter of one of the representatives of the ancient Roman family..
The murder by revenge of relatives for the death in the Neapolitan prison of Virginio Orsini, one of the heads of this family hostile to the pope, whose possessions the father planned to give to the murdered son (the murder was committed in the quarter where many of their people lived, and the mule of the victim was found there)

In popular culture
In most adaptations, he is referred to by his Spanish name, Juan. In Alexandre Dumas' Celebrated Crimes (1839), he is referred to as Francesco.

In Mario Puzo's historical novel The Family, Giovanni Borgia's murder by his younger brother Geoffre is central to the drama and plot of the story.

In the 2010 animated short film, Assassin's Creed: Ascendance, a fictionalised version of Juan's death is depicted at the hand of Cesare Borgia, who hires a prostitute to murder him.

In the 2011 Showtime series, The Borgias, Juan is played by David Oakes and is killed by Cesare in the second season of the series, in "World of Wonders". In the 2011 French/German series, Borgia, Juan is played by French actor Stanley Weber. He is a main character in the first season and dies in that season's finale "The Serpent Rises". In this adaptation, he is the eldest child of Rodrigo and Vannozza, and his murder is perpetrated primarily by Lucrezia—with the help of her lover, Pedro Caldes. Both portrayals depict Juan as haughty, selfish, and cruel, with few redeeming features.

The CBBC television show Horrible Histories features a song portraying the Borgia family, with Ben Willbond as Giovanni Borgia.

See also 
List of unsolved murders
Route of the Borgias

Notes

External links
  Borja o Borgia
  Diario Borja – Borgia Tres siglos de Historia día a día

1475 births
1497 deaths
15th-century condottieri
Captains General of the Church
Deaths by stabbing in Rome
202
Giovanni Borgia, 2nd Duke of Gandía
Illegitimate children of Pope Alexander VI
Italian murder victims
Male murder victims
Nobility from Rome
Unsolved murders in Italy